is a Japanese professional shogi player ranked 7-dan.

Early life
Makoto Tobe was born on August 5, 1986, in Yokohama. He entered the Japan Shogi Association's apprentice school as a student of shogi professional  in October 1998 at the rank of 6-kyū. He was promoted to 1-dan in August 2001, and then obtained full professional status and the rank of 4-dan in October 2006 after winning the 39th 3-dan League (April 2006September 2006) with a record of 15 wins and 3 losses.

Promotion history
The promotion history for Tobe is as follows:
 6-kyū: September 1998
 4-dan: October 1, 2006
 5-dan: March 10, 2009
 6-dan: February 9, 2010
 7-dan: June 1, 2016

Awards and honors
Tobe received the Japan Shogi Association Annual Shogi Awards for "Best New Player" in 2009 and "Best Winning Percentage" (2007 and 2013).

References

External links 

 ShogiHub: Professional Player Info · Tobe, Makoto
 YouTube: 戸辺チャンネル 
 戸辺流ブログ · Tobe's blog 
 戸辺誠将棋教室  
 棋士 戸辺誠 HP 

1986 births
Japanese shogi players
Living people
Professional shogi players
People from Yokohama
Professional shogi players from Kanagawa Prefecture
Shogi YouTubers
Japanese YouTubers